Terry-Jo Myers (born July 23, 1962) is an American professional golfer who played on the LPGA Tour.

Myers won three times on the LPGA Tour between 1988 and 1997.

Myers suffered from interstitial cystitis throughout her career. She was awarded the 1997 Heather Farr Player Award by the LPGA Tour and the 1998 Ben Hogan Award from the Golf Writers Association of America.

Professional wins

LPGA Tour wins (3)

LPGA Tour playoff record (1–0)

References

External links

American female golfers
LPGA Tour golfers
Golfers from Florida
Florida International University alumni
Sportspeople from Fort Myers, Florida
1962 births
Living people
21st-century American women